Fedora Veronesi (born 25 May 1926) is an Italian former basketball player.

External links
Profile at FIP website

1926 births
Possibly living people
Italian women's basketball players
Sportspeople from Bologna